Murom Urban Okrug is a municipal formation (an urban okrug) in Vladimir Oblast, Russia, one of the five urban okrugs in the oblast. Its territory covers the territories of two administrative divisions of Vladimir Oblast—the whole of the City of Murom and nine rural localities in Muromsky District.

The municipal formation previously established within the borders of the City of Murom was granted urban okrug status by the Law #179-OZ of November 11, 2004. By the Law #53-OZ of Vladimir Oblast of May 11, 2005, the borders of the urban okrug were changed to include nine rural localities of Muromsky District.

References

Notes

Sources

External links
Official website of Murom Urban Okrug Administration 

Urban okrugs of Russia
